Wesley "Wes" Williams (born March 31, 1968) is a Canadian rapper, record producer, actor, and author. He is known professionally by his stage names Maestro Fresh Wes (formerly Maestro Fresh-Wes) or Maestro as a musician, and is credited by his birth name as an actor. One of the earliest Canadian rappers to achieve mainstream success, he is credited as the "Godfather of Canadian hip hop". His debut album, Symphony in Effect (1989), was the first certified platinum album by a Black Canadian artist.

Early life and education
Williams was born on March 31, 1968 in Toronto, Ontario to parents of Afro-Guyanese heritage. He is the oldest of three children and was raised in North York and Scarborough. He attended Senator O'Connor College School and then moved to L'Amoreaux Collegiate Institute for the remainder of his high school career.

He attended Carleton University in Ottawa, studying law and political science for one year.

Career

1979–1989: Early career
Williams' interest in hip hop music began at age 11. At age 15, in 1983, he met DJ Ron Nelson, who promoted Williams' music under the moniker Melody MC with Ebony MC as the rap group Vision MC’s on his radio show, 88.1 CKLN-FM. Nearly two years later, Williams met Farley Flex, who he went on to work with in 1988. That same year, he officially adopted the name Maestro Fresh-Wes and recorded the independent demos, "You Can't Stop Us Now" and "I'm Showin' You". While performing on MuchMusic's Electric Circus, Wes met dance artist Stevie B, who connected him with his NYC-based label, LMR. This changed the climate for hip hop in Canada as Wes performed "Let Your Backbone Slide" for the first time. This song became the first single from a Canadian hip hop artist to go gold, followed by Canada's first platinum-selling hip hop album, Symphony in Effect.

1989–1991: Symphony in Effect and "Can't Repress the Cause"
In 1989, Maestro released his first album, Symphony in Effect. The following year he became the first Canadian rapper to have a Billboard Top 40 hit, "Let Your Backbone Slide". In 1991, he collaborated on the one-off single "Can't Repress the Cause", a plea for greater inclusion of hip hop music in the Canadian music scene. The collaboration was with Dance Appeal, a supergroup of Toronto-area musicians that included: Devon, Dream Warriors, B-Kool, Michie Mee, Lillian Allen, Eria Fachin, HDV (aka "Pimp of The Microphone"), Dionne, Thando Hyman, Carla Marshall, Messenjah, Jillian Mendez, Lorraine Scott, Lorraine Segato, Candy Pennella, Self Defense, Leroy Sibbles, Zama and Thyron Lee White.

1991–1999: Entering the U.S market and The Black Tie Affair 
After the success of his 1991 album, The Black Tie Affair, Maestro's career faltered as he attempted to break into the United States market. In 1992, Maestro appeared in a video accompanying a rendition of "O Canada" in which he rapped an improvised second-verse lyric, "aw, yeah, from the east coast, of Newfoundland, to the west coast, of B.C.". He returned to the Canadian charts in 1998 with the hit singles "Stick to Your Vision" and "416/905 (T.O. Party Anthem)".

2000: Ever Since
In 2000, he released his sixth studio album, Ever Since, featured the track "Bustin Loose", in which Maestro teamed up with Kardinal Offishall.

2005: "A Criminal Mind" cover
In 2005, Maestro covered Lawrence Gowan's song "A Criminal Mind" (featuring Infinite); Gowan appears in the video and his vocals are sampled on the track. Gowan also performed the song with Maestro at the Canadian Urban Music Awards in 2006.

2006: Midem conference
In 2006, Maestro and Rochester AKA Juice joined Professor D and The Dope Poet Society on stage in Cannes, France. Together, they become the first Canadian hip hop acts to showcase at Midem, the world's largest annual music industry conference.

2012–2013: Black Tuxedo and Orchestrated Noise
In 2012, Maestro released his first set of new material in over seven years with the release of the EP Black Tuxedo, which was nominated for Best Rap Recording of the Year at the 2012 Juno Awards. This was followed by the album Orchestrated Noise in 2013, which features rocker Sam Roberts, opera singer Measha Brueggergosman, Kardinal Offishall, American rapper Kool G Rap of the Juice Crew, and Brand Nubian veteran Sadat X, among others. Orchestrated Noise was released under the name Maestro Fresh Wes, reclaiming his original title from the 1980s.

2015

Maestro released Compositions Volume 1 which included his personal favorite song he ever wrote, "I know Your Mom", and the sports classic "Underestimated", which was played during the 2015 Pan Am Games and was featured on the EA Sports NHL 17 video game.

2017–2019: Coach Fresh and Champagne Campaign
His 2017 album, Coach Fresh, included the song "Jurassic Park", a collaboration with Rich Kidd to celebrate the Toronto Raptors. In 2019, the song was released as a single and video to celebrate the Raptors making the 2019 NBA Finals. Coach Fresh was also nominated for Best Rap Recording of the Year but was beaten by Canadian MC Tory Lanez. The album Champagne Campaign was released in March 2019. This album featured tracks by Lord Finesse and collaborations with Planet Asia, Sadat X, Dusty Wallace and Naturally Born Strangers. On November 21, 2019, "Let Your Backbone Slide" was the first rap song to be inducted into the Canadian Songwriters Hall of Fame.

Acting
Williams was nominated for a Gemini Award for Best Supporting Actor in a Dramatic Role for his performance on the television series The Line on HBO Canada. He has also had acting roles in the series Metropia, Instant Star, Platinum, and Blue Murder, as well as the films Poor Boy's Game, Honey, Paid In Full, Four Brothers and Redemption: The Stan Tookie Williams Story. As an actor, he is credited as Wes Williams.

Williams played the role of teacher and vice principal Paul Dwyer on the CBC Television program, Mr. D for 8 seasons from 2012-2018.

Author
In 2010, co-wrote a self-help motivational book with his wife called Stick to Your Vision: How to Get Past the Hurdles & Haters to Get Where You Want to Be. The foreword of the book was written by Chuck D of the hiphop group Public Enemy. It is part of the Nova Scotia Community College (NSCC) curriculum and a mandatory reading for high school students in Nova Scotia. In 2016 Wes received an honorary diploma from the NSCC Akerley Campus in Dartmouth NS for his contribution to the community and inspiration to the students.

Charity work
Over his career, Williams has supported the following charities: War Child, Save the Children, SickKids Hospital, Covenant House, Special Olympics, Battered Women's Support Services (BWSS), and the African AIDS Society.

Personal life
In October 2020, Williams and his family relocated from Toronto, and have since resided in Saint John, New Brunswick. He now hosts a weekly radio show on 97.3 The Wave in Saint John called "Maestro In The Maritimes". Williams was the host and MC of the 2022 East Coast Music Awards in Fredericton, New Brunswick.

Discography

Studio albums
Symphony in Effect (1989)
The Black Tie Affair (1991)
Maestro Zone (1992)
Naaah, Dis Kid Can't Be from Canada?!! (1994)
Built to Last (1998)
Ever Since (2000)
Orchestrated Noise (2013)
Coach Fresh (2017)
Champagne Campaign (2019)

EPs
Louie Louie (1990)
Black Tuxedo (2012)
Compositions Volume 1 (2015)

Compilations
Urban Landmark 1989–2005 (2005)

References

External links

1968 births
Living people
20th-century Canadian male musicians
20th-century Canadian rappers
21st-century Canadian male actors
21st-century Canadian male musicians
21st-century Canadian rappers
Attic Records (Canada) artists
Black Canadian male actors
Black Canadian musicians
Canadian hip hop record producers
Canadian male film actors
Canadian male rappers
Canadian male television actors
Canadian people of Guyanese descent
Carleton University alumni
Juno Award for Rap Recording of the Year winners
Male actors from New Brunswick
Male actors from Toronto
Musicians from Saint John, New Brunswick
Rappers from Toronto